Markman is a surname. Notable people with the surname include:

Damien Markman (born 1978), English former professional footballer
Ellen Markman, Lewis M. Terman Professor of Psychology at Stanford University
Gerry Markman (born 1950), guitarist and a manager of Steve's Music Store, Toronto
Maurie Markman, physician and the President of Medicine and Science at Cancer Treatment Centers of America
Ronald Markman (1931–2017), American artist and educator
Stephen Markman (born 1949), 103rd Justice of the Michigan Supreme Court
Winston Markman, Australian soap Home and Away character

See also
Markman hearing, pretrial hearing in a U.S. District Court patent claim
Markman v. Westview Instruments, Inc., United States Supreme Court case on the interpretation of patent claims
Markan (disambiguation)
Marksman (disambiguation)